Electrocar, Electrocart is an electric vehicle, typically a small cart with an electrical driving gear and a storage battery.

In the United Kingdom, similar small electric vehicles were known as electric drays.

A typical Soviet/Belarusian electrocar EC-1.00 (and also its modifications, including EC-1.00-1 designed and manufactured at Mogilev Automobile Plant (MoAZ) is frequently used in factories for the transportation of not so heavy loads, because it does not emit harmful exhaust.

MoAZ EC-1.00 specifications 

 Maximum load - 
 Full mass - 
 Dimensions - 3315 mm (length) x 1300 mm (width) x 2200 mm (height)
 Cargo platform dimensions - 2050 mm (l) x 1300 mm (w)
 Max loading height - 
 Min outer turning radius - 
 Max velocity - 
 Nominal engine power - 4,0 kW
 Nominal voltage - 80V
 Control system - thyristor-impulse- (GTO) or contactor-based

See also

 Battery electric vehicle
 Forklift truck
 Electric platform truck

External links

  Electrocar EC-1.00
  MoAZ EC-1.00-1
  MoAZ EC-2.00, open platform car, modernized version of 1.00
  Electrocars ET-2054 produced at the Kalinin Machine-Building Plant
  Official site of Electrocar B.V., Dutch Electrocar Manufacturer
  Open Bus Electrocar "Capella Leichenwagen"
  "Colibri" Electrocar

Electric vehicles
Microcars